Maulana Shah Abdul Qadir Ludhianvi (Punjabi: مولانا شاہ عبدالقادر لدھیانوی) (died 1860) was a Punjabi Muslim revolutionary who among the first to lead a rebellion in the Eastern Punjab against the East India Company in the Revolt of 1857. He had participated in the war with Bahadur Shah Zafar.

Early life 
Maulana belonged to Arain tribe of Punjab. He was the grandfather of Maulana Habib-ur-Rehman Ludhianvi and great-great-grandfather of Maulana Habibur Rahman Sani.

Rebellion 
In 1857, issued a fatwa against the British rulers. He gathered a large fighting force of locals that drove the British out of not only Ludhiana but also Panipat. He then made way to Delhi to support Bahadur Shah Zafar. He fought a battle alongside the Mughal General Bakht Khan. His wife and seven of his comrades died fighting in Delhi's Chandni Chowk. Her body was buried in the courtyard of the Fatehpuri Mosque in Delhi.

Death 
After the failure of 1857 rebellion, he made his way back and stayed in a village near Ludhiana called Shatrana for a while. The British army chased Maulana back to the village. The Muslim tribes opposed the British forces allowing him to escape to nearby forests. He died in 1860 on his way to Ludhiana.

References 

History of Pakistan

Punjabi people
Resistance to the British Empire
1857 deaths

Year of birth missing
Islam in Pakistan
Islam in India
Islam in Punjab, Pakistan

